Gardenia storckii, locally known as Mbolovatu or Ndrenga, is a species of flowering plant in the family Rubiaceae. It is the only gardenia occurring abundantly in the forested area of Serua Province in southeastern Viti Levu, to which its range is confined. It has been noted in dense, dry, or secondary forest as a slender tree 2-15m high and with a trunk to 14 cm in diameter. Flowers have been obtained in January through March, and fruits between April and November. It produces an abundance of latex. The resiniferous buds are used for chewing, and an extract of the roots is used medicinally for constipation.

References

Endemic flora of Fiji
storckii
Near threatened plants
Taxonomy articles created by Polbot
Taxa named by Daniel Oliver